Gibberula scalarispira is a species of sea snail, a marine gastropod mollusk, in the family Cystiscidae.

Distribution
This marine species occurs off Zanzibar.

References

External links
 MNHN, Paris: holotype

scalarispira
Gastropods described in 1997